Estela Golovchenko (born 16 March 1963) is a Uruguayan playwright, actress, and theater director.

Biography
Estela Golovchenko was born in San Javier, in the Río Negro Department of Uruguay. In 1986, she moved to Fray Bentos (and has since lived there) and joined the theatrical group Teatro sin Fogón.

Thanks to a grant from the Uruguayan Center of the UNESCO International Theater Institute for the first national theater workshop in Uruguay in 1991, and she received classes from Richard Ferraro, Levón and Héctor Manuel Vidal.

Citations

1963 births
Living people
Uruguayan people of Ukrainian descent
Uruguayan women writers
Uruguayan women dramatists and playwrights
Uruguayan stage actresses